Cantonese poetry (Cantonese Jyutping: Jyut6 si1; Traditional Chinese: 粵詩) is poetry performed and composed primarily by Cantonese people. Most of this body of poetry has used classical Chinese grammars, but composed with Cantonese phonology in mind and thus needs to be chanted using the Cantonese language in order to rhyme.

Relation to Middle Chinese literature
Cantonese is, among extant Sinitic languages, some of the closest to Middle Chinese (Jyutping: Zung1 gu2 hon3 jyu5; Traditional Chinese: 中古漢語). Middle Chinese was the prestige language of Tang Empire (7th to 10th century) and Song Empire (10th to 13th century). The works of literature from these dynasties (such as Tang poetry) have been considered some of the best works of literature from all of Chinese dynasties. Due to its closeness to Middle Chinese, Cantonese language is very useful for studying these great works of literature.  This is reflected by the fact that most Tang poems will rhyme better if chanted using Cantonese.

Lingnan school of poetry
Zeung Gau-ling (Jyutping: Zoeng1 gau2 ling4; Traditional Chinese: 張九齢) was a poet of the Tang Empire, and he was born and raised in what is modern day's Gwongdung. Twelve of his poems were listed in Three Hundred Tang Poems, a compilation of the finest works of Tang poetry. He has been considered the earliest Cantonese poet (although strictly speaking, Cantonese languages had not yet fully formed at that time). In the centuries that followed, there have been numerous poets of varying levels of prominence from the area of Gwongdung, resulting in the formation of Lingnan school of poetry (Jyutping: Ling5 naam4 si1 paai3; Traditional Chinese: 嶺南詩派), named after "Lingnan", an archaic name for what is modern day Cantonese provinces of Gwongdung and Gwongsai. Stylistically, this school has been noted for having two streams of poetry: On one hand, there were poets like Zeung Gau-ling, who preferred to follow royal standards at that time, while poets like Siu kit (Jyutping: Siu6 kit3; Traditional Chinese: 邵謁) composed poems marked by little use of rhetoric. Both streams, however, composed poetry using classical Chinese grammars - while these poems still tend to use Cantonese phonology, they certainly do not sound like everyday Cantonese speech. Aside from this, this school is noted for maintaining Middle Chinese pronunciations for Chinese characters, involving imagery unique to the Lingnan region, and a spirit of revolution. This style has been described as "magnificent and vigorous" (Jyutping: Hung4 zik6; Traditional Chinese: 雄直).

In terms of formats, the Lingnan school of poetry is largely similar to poems composed by other Han Chinese groups.

Ming Dynasty development
The term "Lingnan school of poetry" was first coined by the Ming Dynasty (14th to 17th century) scholar Wu Ying-loen. At that time, the Lingnan school, alongside the schools of Wuyue, Hokkien, and Gan poetry, was listed as one of the great schools of poetry in all of China. In 17th century (late Ming period), there were the "three great experts of Lingnan" (Jyutping: Ling5 naam4 saam1 gaa1; Traditional Chinese: 嶺南三家), who advocated greater realism in Chinese-language poetry - they composed poetry that depicted the hardship faced by average peasants. This was considered quite unorthodox at that time.

Vernacular Cantonese poetry
Cantonese poetry saw further development in the late 19th century, where the Cantonese poet Liu Yan-tou (Jyutping: Liu6 jan1 tou4; Traditional Chinese: 廖恩燾; 1863–1954) composed poetry in vernacular Cantonese — poems that actually sound like everyday Cantonese speech. His works have seen a rise in popularity in recent years, compiled in the "Play and smile collection". (Jyutping: Hei1 siu3 zaap6; Traditional Chinese: 嬉笑集).

Recent development
Since the 21st century, Cantonese people have started studying their own style of poetry in great depth. A compilation entitled "All Cantonese poems" (Jyutping: Cyun4 jyut6 si1; Traditional Chinese: 全粵詩) has been produced to compile works of past Cantonese poets. Currently, it has spanned 30 volumes and yet to be complete.

See also
Written Cantonese
Cantonese culture
Tang poetry
Chinese poetry
Hong Kong literature

References

 
Poetry by language